Boris Becker defeated the two-time defending champion Ivan Lendl in the final, 1–6, 6–4, 6–4, 6–4 to win the men's singles tennis title at the 1991 Australian Open.

Seeds

 Stefan Edberg (semifinals)
 Boris Becker (champion)
 Ivan Lendl (final)
 Pete Sampras (withdrew because of shin splints)
 Goran Ivanišević (third round)
 Emilio Sánchez (first round)
 Brad Gilbert (third round)
 Jonas Svensson (third round)

 Andrei Chesnokov (first round)
 Guy Forget (quarterfinals)
 Jakob Hlasek (first round)
 Jay Berger (third round)
 Aaron Krickstein (fourth round)
 Andrei Cherkasov (second round)
 Marc Rosset (first round)
 Jim Courier (fourth round)

Qualifying

Draw

Finals

Top half

Section 1

Section 2

Section 3

Section 4

Bottom half

Section 5

Section 6

Section 7

Section 8

Notes

a.  Andre Agassi (No. 4), Andrés Gómez (No. 6), Thomas Muster (No. 7), John McEnroe (No. 13), Guillermo Pérez Roldán (No. 14), Michael Chang (No. 15) and Juan Aguilera (No. 19) all withdrew from the tournament prior to the seedings.

References
General

Specific

External links
 1991 Australian Open – Men's draws and results at the International Tennis Federation

Mens singles
Australian Open (tennis) by year – Men's singles